Phyllodium pulchellum is a plant in the family Fabaceae.

Medicinal

Traditional
In Bangladesh, a bark decoction is used for hemorrhage, diarrhea, poisoning and eye diseases. Flowers are used in biliousness.

Chemical composition
Plant: Bufotenin and its methyl ether, DMT and its oxides, two tryptamine derivatives, gramine, 15 indole-3-alkylamine, tryptophan bases, β-carbolines

Seeds: Galactomannan, L-glucosyl rhamnoside of physcion

Roots: Betulin, α-amyrin, β-sitosterol

The alkaloids are mainly of three broad structural types, i.e. indole-3-alkylamine, beta-carbolines, and tetrahydro-β-carboline.

References

Desmodieae